"Invisible Sun" is a song by British rock band the Police, released as a single in Europe in September 1981. It was the first single to be released in the United Kingdom from the album Ghost in the Machine and it reached  on the official chart. It was not released as a single in the U.S. In most other territories, "Every Little Thing She Does Is Magic" was chosen as the lead single from the LP.

Background
Sting said of writing "Invisible Sun":

The song's lyrics stem from songwriter Sting's pondering how people living in war-torn and/or impoverished countries find the will to go on living, and despite the dark music and often morbid lyrical statements, the song carries an uplifting and optimistic message. The song was deeply personal for drummer Stewart Copeland, whose hometown of Beirut was being heavily bombed at the time of the song's recording:

Bono performed duets of it with Sting when U2 and the Police appeared at the same concerts: the first such instance was in 1982 at a festival in Gateshead, England, and two subsequent instances occurred at the last two shows of Amnesty International's A Conspiracy of Hope Tour in 1986.

The song is a departure from Police songs before it; "Invisible Sun" contains a dark, looping synthesizer beat, and powerful, haunting lyrics. Among other things, the lyrics refer to the ArmaLite rifle used by paramilitary organisations, but mainly by the Provisional Irish Republican Army. The music video for "Invisible Sun" features a collection of video clips taken from the conflict in Northern Ireland. Owing to its subject matter, it was banned by the BBC.

In 1998, Sting recorded a new version of "Invisible Sun" with the British reggae group Aswad. The song was revised as a duet between Sting and vocalist Tony "Gad" Robinson with an upbeat tempo and a prominent horn section. The track was featured in The X-Files: The Album, a promotional soundtrack album released to accompany the film The X-Files: Fight The Future.

Composition
"Invisible Sun" is composed in the key of E-flat major/C minor with the verses alternating between these keys.  The verses give off an ominous and desperate feeling. The chorus is in G major and is heavier and more bombastic.

Track listings
7-inch: A&M / AMS 8164 (UK)
 "Invisible Sun" – 3:35
 "Shambelle" – 5:42

7-inch: A&M / AMS 8164 (NL)
 "Invisible Sun" – 3:35
 "Flexible Strategies" – 3:42

Personnel
Sting – bass guitar, keyboards, lead and backing vocals
Andy Summers – guitars, effects
Stewart Copeland – drums

Charts

Certifications

See also
List of songs banned by the BBC
List of anti-war songs

References

The Police songs
1981 singles
The X-Files music
Songs about the military
Songs written by Sting (musician)
Song recordings produced by Hugh Padgham
Songs about The Troubles (Northern Ireland)
A&M Records singles
1981 songs
Anti-war songs
Songs banned by the BBC